Nehalennia pallidula, the Everglades sprite, is a species of damselfly in the family Coenagrionidae. It is endemic to the United States, where it has been found only in Florida and Texas. Its natural habitats are swamps and freshwater marshes. It is threatened by habitat loss from water diversion, peat fires, and invasive species. It has a low level of detection due to its preference for dense vegetation and its small size.

References

Coenagrionidae
Insects of the United States
Odonata of North America
Insects described in 1913
Taxonomy articles created by Polbot